Michalis Chrisochoidis (born 31 October 1955 in Nisi, Imathia) is a Greek politician and former member of the Hellenic Parliament for the Panhellenic Socialist Movement (PASOK). He served as Minister for Citizen Protection (1999–2003, 2009–2010, 2012 and 2019–2021), Minister for the Economy, Competitiveness and Shipping (2010), Minister for Regional Development and Competitiveness (2010–2011), Minister for Development, Competitiveness and Shipping (2011–2012) and Minister for Infrastructure, Transport and Networks (2013–2015).

Life 
Michalis Chrisochoidis was born on 31 October 1955, in the village of Nisi near Alexandreia in Imathia, Greece.

He graduated from the Law School of the Aristotle University of Thessaloniki. He started practicing law as an attorney in Veria in 1981.

In 1974, Chrisochoidis joined PASOK. Ηe served as prefect of Karditsa prefecture from 1987 to 1989. From June 1989 until PASOK's electoral collapse due to the Greek government-debt crisis, he was elected to parliament at every election, initially for Imathia (1989–2004) and from 2007 for the Athens B constituency. He failed to be returned to parliament at the January 2015 election.

Chrisochoidis was first appointed to government as the Deputy Minister for Trade (1994–1996). He subsequently served as Deputy Minister for Development (1996–1999), Minister for Public Order (1999–2003) and Minister for Citizen Protection (2009–2010). In September 2010, he was appointed Minister for Regional Development and Competitiveness. On 27 June 2011, the ministry merged with the Ministry of Maritime Affairs, Islands and Fisheries to form the Ministry of Development, Competitiveness and Shipping.

During his time at the Ministry of Public Order, the Revolutionary Organization 17 November, a major Greek urban guerrilla or terrorist group was dismantled in 2002, and six suspected members of Revolutionary Struggle were arrested in 2010.

In 1995, Chrisochoidis was appointed to the secretariat of the Party of European Socialists.

On 9 July 2019, Chrisochoidis was appointed Minister for Citizen Protection in the Cabinet of Kyriakos Mitsotakis and was consequently expelled from PASOK and the Movement for Change.

References

External links 
 Official website
 Official Facebook page

1955 births
Aristotle University of Thessaloniki alumni
Government ministers of Greece
Greek MPs 1989 (June–November)
Greek MPs 1989–1990
Greek MPs 1990–1993
Greek MPs 1993–1996
Greek MPs 1996–2000
Greek MPs 2000–2004
Greek MPs 2004–2007
Greek MPs 2007–2009
Greek MPs 2009–2012
Greek MPs 2012 (May)
Greek MPs 2012–2014
Living people
Ministers of Public Order of Greece
PASOK politicians
People from Alexandreia, Greece